ESO 146-5 (ESO 146-IG 005) is the designation given to a giant interacting elliptical galaxy in the center of the Abell 3827 cluster. It is well noted due to its strong gravitational lensing effect, measurements of which show the galaxy to be one of the most massive in the known universe.

Physical characteristics
This interacting galaxy was found 1.4 billion light years away in the center of Abell 3827. A huge halo of stars is surrounding its interacting nuclei. It has immense gravity that holds the cluster together due to its mass. Its unusual shape has led to the conclusion that each one of the nuclei was formed from multiple collisions of smaller galaxies, and now the nuclei are merging to form a single huge elliptical galaxy.

Gravitational lensing calculations appeared to show that there is a large dark matter mass lagging the top left nucleus, possibly explained by it being self-interacting dark matter. However, this finding has since been discounted based on further observations and modelling of the cluster.

Mass
Observations from the Gemini South Telescope has shown that ESO 146-5 has gravitationally lensed two galaxies, a galaxy 2.7 billion light years away, and the other, 5.1 billion light years away. Using Einstein's theory of general relativity, it was measured to be approximately 30 trillion solar masses, making it the one of the most massive galaxies in the known universe.

Gallery

References

Further reading
 The Possible First Signs of Self-interacting Dark Matter. April 2015 in the "10 kpc core of Abell 3827" reporting on :
 

Indus (constellation)
Articles containing video clips
Elliptical galaxies